"Cuff It" is a song by American singer Beyoncé from her seventh studio album, Renaissance (2022). The song was written and produced by Beyoncé, Nova Wav, Morten Ristorp, Raphael Saadiq and The-Dream, with additional writing by Nile Rodgers. The song contains an interpolation of "Ooo La La La", written by Teena Marie and Allen McGrier and performed by Teena Marie. It impacted rhythmic and urban contemporary radio in the United States on October 4, 2022.

"Cuff It" charted in more than a dozen territories and received acclaim from critics. Almost two months after the release of Renaissance, the album track began to trend on social media and had a resurgence in popularity. "Cuff It" re-entered several charts around the world, with new peaks in Australia, Belgium, France, Ireland, the Netherlands, New Zealand, Switzerland, and the United Kingdom. Thereupon released as a single, it peaked at number six on the US Billboard Hot 100, becoming Beyoncé's second top-ten single from Renaissance and her 21st as a soloist. "Cuff It" won the award for Best R&B Song at the 65th Annual Grammy Awards.

On February 3, 2023, Beyoncé released a "Wetter Remix" of the song, after Esentrik a DJ who unofficially mashed up the instrumental of 2009's "Wetter" by Twista with "Cuff It", it went viral online then being officially released adding new vocals and lyrics, exclusively available to purchase through her website. The remix was made available on streaming services the following week.

Background

Beyoncé told British Vogue that the lockdown due to the COVID-19 pandemic changed her as a person, stating that she has "spent a lot of time focusing on building my legacy and representing my culture the best way I know how. Now, I've decided to give myself permission to focus on my joy." She released her seventh studio album, Renaissance, in July 2022 to critical acclaim. "Cuff It" appears as the fourth track on the album, and was written and produced by Beyoncé, Nova Wav, Morten Ristorp, Raphael Saadiq and The-Dream, while additional writing was handled by Nile Rodgers. The song contains an interpolation of "Ooo La La La", written by Teena Marie & Allen McGrier and performed by Teena Marie.

Critical reception
"Cuff It" received acclaim from music critics. Exclaim! Vernon Ayiku declared the track as "the album's biggest standout" and described it as a "groovy feel-good anthem". AllMusic's Andy Kellman opined that "Cuff It" was "a disco-funk burner with Nile Rodgers' inimitable rhythm guitar" and that it has "all the vigor of Lady T's uptempo classics". USA Today critic Melissa Ruggieri described the song as a "soulful bop" and praised the signature guitar-funk sound of co-writer Nile Rodgers. Mikael Wood of Los Angeles Times categorized the song as "ebullient disco fantasia" and praised Beyoncé's sensual vocal delivery. Billboard additionally ranked it as the best song from Renaissance.

Accolades

Commercial performance
In the United States, "Cuff It" debuted at number 13 on the Billboard Hot 100 for the week ending August 13, 2022. It peaked at number six for the week ending February 18, 2023, becoming Beyoncé's twenty-first top ten single in the country as a solo artist and the second top ten single from Renaissance. In Canada, the song debuted on the Canadian Hot 100 at number 37. After being released as the second single from Renaissance, the song reached a peak of number 16 for the week ending December 3, 2022.

In the United Kingdom, "Cuff It" debuted at number 14 on the Official Singles Chart on August 5, 2022. The song reached a peak of number five on October 14, 2022. In Ireland, "Cuff It" debuted at number 17 on September 23. On October 14, the song reached a peak of number six.

In New Zealand, "Cuff It" debuted at number 39 on the Official New Zealand Music Chart. The song rose 31 positions the following week to reach number eight, and peaked at number three on the week dated October 14, becoming Beyoncé's 20th top ten single in the country. In Australia, "Cuff It" reached a peak of number eight on October 17, 2022, becoming Beyoncé's 15th top ten single in the country.

Personnel and credits

Sample
 contains an interpolation of "Ooh La La La", written by Mary Brockert and Allen McGrier and performed by Teena Marie.

Recording locations
The Juicy Juicy (Los Angeles, California)
Nightbread Recording Studios (Los Angeles, California)
Parkwood West (Los Angeles, California)
Blakeslee Studio (North Hollywood, California)
Le Crib (Westport, Connecticut)
Tree Sound Studios (Atlanta, Georgia)
The Trailer (East Hampton, New York)

Personnel
Performers
 Vocals by Beyoncé
 background vocals by Beam

Musicians
 Jamelle Adisa – trumpet
 Daniel Crawford – piano
 Honey Dijon – drum programming
 The-Dream – synths
 Sheila E. – percussion
 Lemar Guillary – trombone
 Scott Mayo – saxophone
 Chris Penny – drum programming
 Nile Rodgers – guitar
 Raphael Saadiq – bass, drums, arp string, clavinet
 Luke Solomon – drum programming

Technical credits
 Beyoncé – production, vocal production
 Matheus Braz – assistant engineering
 Chi Coney – engineering
 John Cranfield – engineering
 The-Dream – additional production
 Russell Graham – recording
 Brandon Harding – engineering
 Hotae Alexander Jang – recording
 NovaWav – production
 Rissi – co-production
 Andrea Roberts – engineering
 Steve Rusch – recording
 Raphael Saadiq – co-production
 Stuart White – mixing, recording

Charts

Weekly charts

Year-end charts

Certifications

Release history

References

Beyoncé songs
2022 songs
Columbia Records singles
Songs written by Beyoncé
Songs written by The-Dream
Songs written by Raphael Saadiq
Songs written by Nile Rodgers
Songs written by Morten Ristorp
Song recordings produced by Beyoncé
Song recordings produced by The-Dream
Song recordings produced by Raphael Saadiq